The Somb river, also spelled Som river (Hindi: सोम नदी) is a tributary of Yamuna in Haryana state of India.

Origin and route
The Somb river originates in the Shivalik hills near Adi Badri (Haryana) in Yamunanagar district on the border of Haryana and  Himachal Pradesh State.

In 1875-76 Pathrala barrage at Dadupur was built where  Somb river meets Western Yamuna Canal in Haryana.

The basin is classified in two parts, Khadir and Bangar, the higher area that is not flooded in rainy season is called Bangar and the lower flood-prone area is called Khadar.

Irrigation and Hydal Power 
The Western Yamuna Canal has several check dams in Yamunanagar district and Hydal power is generated at Pathrala barrage. some of which are also used for the hydel power generation.

Identification with Vedic rivers 
The Somb river passing through here is considered by some to follow the course of the Rig Vedic Sarasvati river.

Gallery

See also 

 Dangri, a tributary of Sarsuti, merge if Dangri and Tangri are same 
 Sarsuti, a tributary of Ghaggar-Hakra River 
 Kaushalya river, a tributary of Ghaggar-Hakra River
 Markanda river, Haryana, a tributary of Ghaggar-Hakra River
 Chautang, a tributary of Ghaggar-Hakra River
 Sutlej, a tributary of Indus
 Ganges
 Indus
 Western Yamuna Canal, branches off Yamuna

References

Sources

Rivers of Himachal Pradesh
Rivers of Haryana
Rigvedic rivers
International rivers of Asia
Sarasvati River
Rivers of India